Stewed tomatoes is a dish typical of the United States, prepared using fresh tomatoes, garlic and herbs, and consumed with bread or meat. Stew refers to the combination of vegetables and food ingredients that are cooked in a liquid medium. Moreover, Stewed Tomatoes is a stew made of tomatoes, it includes cooking the tomato at slow heat to keep its shape intact and only cook to such point that its flavors oozes out in order to create a tangy taste. Eaten both as main dish and a side dish, stewed tomatoes have made a special place for themselves in cuisine of the United States and is prepared on occasions such as Thanksgiving. Although the dish is old, it is still part of the diet of many in the United States. It also has high nutritional value.

Origins

Etymology 

The word tomato originated from the Spanish word Tomate, meaning the "swelling fruit" due to its plumpness. While, the word stewed may owe its origins from the old French word estuver which means "plunging into bath or taking a hot bath". The word stew may also have been originated from the vulgar Latin word extufere which means "to evaporate".

The American kitchen 
The tomato is native to the continent of South America, and was introduced in North America in the 1710s by British colonialists. The origins of stewed tomatoes can be dated back to the nineteenth century when the cultivation of tomatoes increased in North America. The large amount of cultivation of tomatoes in American households made way for a variety of dishes like stews and ketchup.

The first mention of tomatoes in North America was in 1710, when William Salmon wrote a book about English herbals named History of Plant. In the 1830s, mass production of tomato juice was developed, following which stewed tomatoes entered the market. It was not until the 1950s that stewed tomatoes were recorded and diversified ways of storing tomatoes were developed, like the use of freezing and canning.

Historical rises in the stewed tomatoes were due to the rising production of tomatoes in the United States. The rapid growth of technologies in developing innovative approaches for harvesting tomatoes drove up local production. Thus, in 1860s, the improved approaches in production and harvests drove up the adoption rate of stewed tomatoes in California.  Food historian Andrew F. Smith stated that stewed tomatoes became popular in the United States during the 1860s. The dish has since gained popularity and is now a favorite side as well as main dish of the American Kitchen. Currently, the dish is prepared on special occasions like Thanksgiving, in American kitchens, often as a combination with casseroles and puddings. Noted food historian Betty Fussell stated that stewed tomatoes were one of the most loved and common dishes for her grandfather's generation. She adds that she remembers heating tomatoes and adding butter, salt and sugar in it, to create a dish that was served with bread on a daily basis. Not only household kitchens but restaurants and eateries also included stewed tomatoes in their menu due to its popularity. One of the first racing track in Kentucky had stewed tomatoes on its menu in the year 1788.

Preparations 
The earliest recipe of the dish can be found in the work The Frugal Housewife by Lydia Maria Child published in the year 1829. Child has explained a simple recipe of a catsup created by boiling tomatoes in hot water and adding herbs and garlic which can be served as a side dish with chowder and meat. However, over the decades' variations in the preparation of the dish has risen all over the country.

Preparing 
The tomatoes should be washed, inspected, chopped into pieces, and peeled during preparation. The cooked process should ensure the temperature higher than 190 °F. The acidity level of tomatoes becomes a strong concern since 1950s, as it has the pH level below 4.6. Preparing the stewed tomatoes might help to leverage this level higher than 4.6, and the recommendations for preparing stewed tomatoes include the prolonged processing time in order to maintain good tastes and best status for future storage. For instance, in the 210 °F, the time for processing should be around 35 and 45.

Recipe  
A variety of recipes of stewed tomatoes are available in cookery books and on the internet in the present day. A common quick recipe of the dish that is used by almost all American home is the combination of tomatoes and veggies to form a wholesome meal.

Ingredients

Tomatoes - 2

Butter- 1 tablespoon

Garlic- 2 cloves

Bell peppers- 1

Celery- 2 stalks

Salt and pepper- to taste

Basil- 1/4 tablespoon

Preparing the dish involves cooking all the ingredients in a large saucepan for almost 7–10 minutes, until the tomatoes turn soft and juicy.
Cooling tomatoes into the sink of ice water by putting the kettle. Pour the stewed tomato into freezer container which is wide top and leave about 1/2 inch between the cover. Seal, label, and cool for up to 10 months.

Variations 
Every American household may have a different way of making stewed tomatoes, some may add veggies and some may prefer it in the old style with only tomatoes and herbs.

As a side 
Stewed tomatoes is served as a side, complementing consuming wines and red meat. The preparation of beef will affect the experiences of taking red wine and the two are positively related. Stewed tomatoes will provide sufficient acids, which combined with sugars will create a strong flavour and aroma of beef, which will in turn enrich the taste of red wine. Therefore, many restaurants usually use the stewed tomatoes as siders to prepare beef, usually creating the fresh tastes and thus promote the sales of both beef and red wines.

Similarly, the flavour of stewed pork can also be improved by the use of stewed tomatoes, but they play limit impacts on the tastes of red wine. Besides, the stewed tomatoes could improve the efficiency in preparing stewed pork by directly putting the canned stewed tomatoes into the stewed pork. Not only the tastes, but also the colours are attractive by adding stewed tomatoes.

Storage 
Another benefit of stewed tomatoes is the ease of storage. When finishing the stewed tomatoes, one could put them into the print or quart jars with around headspace for 0.5 inch and then seal them for the long-term storage. It could be further used for preparing pasta and soups. Furthermore, stewed tomatoes could be good toppings for some meats, like baked chicken and steaks.

Fresh tomatoes could only store for 28 days, beyond which the qualities would be undermined. Such features make people develop new ways to consume tomatoes and stewed tomatoes that put in cans become a frequent approach to deal with the rising production of tomatoes. Such approach can help to maintain the quality of whole tomatoes and prevent wastage.

Nutrition 

Stewed tomatoes have a high nutrition content. It contains large amounts of vitamin A and vitamin C. Vitamin A is a rich source of antioxidants and keeps the neurological system of the body healthy, while vitamin C keeps the immunity of the body intact and also keeps the skin healthy. Moreover, the addition of vegetables like celery, onion, mushrooms and bell peppers increases the nutritional value of the dish. Stewed tomatoes comprises four types of carotenoids—lycopene, beta-carotene, lutein and zeaxanthin. Besides, it contain the highest amount of lycopene in them which helps the human body to fight diseases like cancer. Stewed Tomatoes are a rich source of iron and Vitamin B, too. One single cup of stewed Tomatoes contain almost 80 calories and 7.5 grams of fibres which is very good for people's digestive and intestinal tract. It also contains 673 international units of vitamin A and 18 milligrams of vitamin C. Vitamin E, potassium, and fibre are also high in the stewed tomatoes, which will be good skins, and supplement the daily needs for potassium and fibres. Long-term intakes can prevent heart problems and maintain good blood pressures. In particular, the stewed tomatoes have rich lycopene that could be easily absorbed through the cooking process. Stewed tomatoes also has rick Vitamin B2, which is good for the metabolically process and the development antibody for people. accordingly, those have sufficient intakes of tomatoes in their diets usually have better health and lower risks of getting flues.

Mental health 
At least one study has shown a significant negative correlation between consumption of tomatoes and severity of depressive symptoms in Japanese elders.  Another study shows an association between diet (including specifically consumption of tomatoes), regular exercise, and lower levels of psychological stress, but the causality in this study is unclear.

Physical health 
Stewed tomatoes are a type of well acknowledged healthy diet with high nutrition but low calories. Furthermore, their flavours are usually good for young children and easy to chew. Therefore, stewed tomatoes are frequently used for preparing food for babies and young children. With the rising issue of obesity, many day-care centres in North America now use the stewed tomatoes as a weekly diet for children to ensure the sufficient intakes of vegetables and prevent obesity among children.

Stewed tomatoes could also provide sufficient fiber in addition to the high volumes of vitamin C. Fibres will help to prevent constipation and fibres in tomatoes are especially important for women. Those Women with intakes of high volumes of stewed tomatoes usually show less chances of breast cancer, which is due to the negative association between the risk of breast cancer and intakes of potatoes.

Popularity 
Stewed tomatoes have turned into a very popular dish among the Americans. Its popularity in some American cities like Dayton is so high that restaurants have dedicated a whole column to the dish on their menus. A survey conducted by a local newspaper suggests that stewed tomatoes have been an integral part of the lives of Americans growing up and therefore, the restaurants never remove stewed tomatoes from the menus although the dish is almost two centuries old. Moreover, its use as both a main and a side dish increases its popularity among people and some restaurants serve it as a side dish with almost every dish.

Stewed tomatoes are now popular in the global domain. It has been introduced to Asian countries in 1970s, and Japanese show high preference for such food. The fast life pace in this country drive up the needs for simple food preparation and stewed tomatoes are perceived as core source of green and yellow vegetables in a typical Japanese diet. In China, stewed tomatoes are sometimes combined with the use of noodles, which is similar to the preparation of spaghettis.

Rich in nutrition, ease of preparation and storage, and quick process for eating all make the stewed tomatoes popular.

See also

 List of tomato dishes

References 

Tomato dishes